Thomas Magorimbo (born 28 July 1985) is a retired Zimbabwean football defender.

References

1985 births
Living people
Zimbabwean footballers
Shooting Stars F.C. (Zimbabwe) players
Kiglon F.C. players
Dynamos F.C. players
ZPC Kariba F.C. players
Zimbabwe international footballers
Association football defenders
Zimbabwe Premier Soccer League players